The grey-headed gull (Chroicocephalus cirrocephalus), also known as the gray-hooded gull, is a small species of gull which breeds patchily in South America and Africa south of the Sahara. It is not truly migratory, but is more widespread in winter. This species has occurred as a rare vagrant to North America, Italy and Spain. As is the case with many gulls, it has traditionally been placed in the genus Larus.

This locally abundant gull breeds in large colonies in reedbeds and marshes, and lays two or three eggs in a nest, which can be on the ground or floating. Like most gulls, it is highly gregarious in winter, both when feeding and in evening roosts. Although it is predominantly coastal or estuarine, it is not a pelagic species, and is rarely seen at sea far from land.

Flocks numbering hundreds or thousands of these gulls can form when the feeding conditions are appropriate.

The grey-headed gull is slightly larger than the black-headed gull at 42 cm length. The summer adult has a pale gray head, a gray body, darker in tone than the black-headed, and red bill and legs. The black tips to the primary wing feathers have conspicuous white "mirrors". The underwing is dark gray with black wingtips. The gray hood is lost in winter, leaving just dark streaks.

Sexes are similar. The South American race is slightly larger and paler-backed than the African subspecies.

C. c. cirrocephalus (Vieillot, 1818) – South America
C. c. poiocephalus (William John Swainson, 1837) – Africa

This gull takes two years to reach maturity. First year birds have a black terminal tail band, and more dark areas in the wings.

In flight, the wings are broader and held flatter than those of black-headed gull.

This is a noisy species, especially at colonies. The call is a raucous  crow-like caw, caw.

References

 Seabirds by Harrison, 
 Birds of The Gambia by Barlow, Wacher and Disley, 
 Pons J.M., Hassanin, A., and Crochet P.A.(2005). Phylogenetic relationships within the Laridae (Charadriiformes: Aves) inferred from mitochondrial markers. Molecular Phylogenetics and Evolution 37(3):686-699

External links
 Species text in The Atlas of Southern African Birds

grey-headed gull
Birds of South America
Birds of Sub-Saharan Africa
grey-headed gull
Taxa named by Louis Jean Pierre Vieillot